Živko Gocić (born 22 August 1982) is a former Serbian water polo player. He was a member of the Serbian teams that won bronze medals at the 2008 and 2012 Olympics and a gold medal in 2016. He also held the world title in 2009 and 2015 and the European title in 2003, 2006, 2012, 2014 and 2016. In December 2013 he became captain of the national team.

Club career

Szolnoki Dózsa-KÖZGÉP
On 27 September 2011, Gocić scored a goal in the first round of the Vodafone OB-1, in the 9–7 away win against Szentesi VK. Gocić scored his second goal of the Vodafone OB-1 season in the third round easy 12–5 away win against Orvosegyetem SC. Gocić scored his third goal of the Vodafone OB-1 season in the fourth round 10–9 away win against BVSC- Zugló. Gocić scored his fourth goal in the 10–9 Vodafone OB-1 fifth round home defeat to ZF-Eger. Gocić scored his fifth goal of the Vodafone OB-1 season in the sixth round 16–7 easy away win against FTC Fisher Klíma. Gocić scored his sixth goal of the Vodafone OB-1 season in the eight round 13–6 away win against Groupama Honvéd. Gocić scored his seventh goal of the Vodafone OB-1 season in the 7–6 ninth round home defeat to TEVA-VasasUNIQA. Živko Gocić scored two goals in the 9–4 Vodafone OB-1 home win against Debrecen Fujitsu.

National career
Gocić scored his first goal at the European Championship on 17 January against Germany in a second game which the Serbs won by 13–12. On 19 January, in a third game of the tournament, he scored his second goal in a difficult 15–12 victory against the defending European champions Croatia. On 21 January in the fourth match, Gocić scored his third goal of the tournament for his national team in a routine victory against Romania 14–5. On 23 January, in the last round of group A, which Serbia lost to Montenegro with 11–7, Gocić scored two goals. On 29 January, Gocić won the European Championship with his national team beating in the final Montenegro by 9–8.

Honours

Club
VK Partizan
 National Championship of Serbia: 2008–09, 2009–10
 National Cup of Serbia: 2008–09, 2009–10
 Eurointer League: 2010

Personal life
Gocić is married to Svetlana and has a son Rodic.

See also
 Serbia men's Olympic water polo team records and statistics
 List of Olympic champions in men's water polo
 List of Olympic medalists in water polo (men)
 List of world champions in men's water polo
 List of World Aquatics Championships medalists in water polo

References

External links

 

1982 births
Living people
Sportspeople from Belgrade
Serbian male water polo players
Water polo centre backs
Water polo players at the 2008 Summer Olympics
Water polo players at the 2012 Summer Olympics
Water polo players at the 2016 Summer Olympics
Medalists at the 2008 Summer Olympics
Medalists at the 2012 Summer Olympics
Medalists at the 2016 Summer Olympics
Olympic gold medalists for Serbia in water polo
Olympic bronze medalists for Serbia in water polo
World Aquatics Championships medalists in water polo
European champions for Serbia and Montenegro
European champions for Serbia
Competitors at the 2009 Mediterranean Games
Mediterranean Games medalists in water polo
Mediterranean Games gold medalists for Serbia
Serbian water polo coaches
Serbian expatriate sportspeople in Hungary
Serbian expatriate sportspeople in Italy
Serbian expatriate sportspeople in Russia